Tiratricol (also known as TRIAC or triiodothyroacetic acid) is a thyroid hormone analogue. Triiodothyroacetic acid is also a physiologic thyroid hormone that is present in the normal organism in low concentrations.

Uses
It is indicated in the management of thyroid hormone resistance syndrome and is used, in combination with levothyroxine, to suppress thyroid-stimulating hormone production in patients with thyroid cancer.

It has been investigated for use in reducing goiter.

It has also shown some effectiveness in reducing the atrophy caused when using corticosteroids.

Tiratricol has also been widely marketed, under various trade names, as a weight loss aid. In 1999 and 2000, the United States Food and Drug Administration and Health Canada both issued warnings to the public regarding the use of dietary supplements containing tiratricol.

Legal status
Tiratricol is not approved for sale in Canada or the United States. It was once an approved drug in Brazil, but its marketing authorization was suspended in 2003, effectively prohibiting its sale. Tiratricol is still available in France for therapy of thyroid hormone resistance and adjuvant therapy of thyroid cancer. It is available as an orphan drug to be prescribed by registered specialists in Europe.

References

External links 
 

Orphan drugs
Iodoarenes
Phenols
Phenol ethers
Thyroid hormone receptor agonists